Adam Pearce may refer to

 Adam Pearce (born 1978), American professional wrestler
 Adam Pearce (soccer), Australian soccer player